Mehmet Murat Okur (born 26 May 1979) is a Turkish former professional basketball player.

Okur is known for his three-point shooting and ability to space the floor. In his seven seasons with the Utah Jazz, he emerged as a talented shooter in the NBA. From 2004 to 2010, he displayed a talent for making big shots in pressure situations, earning him the nickname of "The Money Man" and "Memo is Money" among Jazz fans. Okur was also the first Turkish player in NBA history to win an NBA championship with the Detroit Pistons in 2004

In 2016, Okur was named a player development coach for the Phoenix Suns, becoming the first Turkish citizen to enter the coaching world in the NBA.

Early career
Okur notes Toni Kukoč was his favorite player while he was growing up. He helped the Turkish 22-and-under national team to 6th place at the 1997 world championship. He was transferred to Efes Pilsen (now known as Anadolu Efes) in 2000 and won a championship in the 2001–2002 Turkish Basketball League season. He averaged 13.5 points per game during his last season in Turkey.

Professional career

Detroit Pistons (2002–2004)
Okur was selected 38th overall in the second round of the 2001 NBA Draft by the Detroit Pistons. He played two seasons for the Pistons from 2002–03 to 2003–04, helping Detroit win the NBA championship in June 2004. He became the first Turkish player to win an NBA championship. Due to salary cap limitations, the Pistons were unable to pay a top-level salary for Okur, but he was able to parlay his success into a six-year, US$50 million contract with the Utah Jazz.

Utah Jazz (2004–2011)
Standing  and 290 lbs (132 kg), Okur played the center and power forward positions for the Utah Jazz. In his first season (2004–2005) with Utah, he played in all 82 games, starting in 25 of them. Nicknamed "Memo", Okur made his presence felt during his second (2005–2006) season with Utah, increasing his scoring average from 12.9 points per game the previous season to 18.0 points per game. He started in all 82 games for the second straight season, the only Utah Jazz player to do so. In his third season, he continued to be a key player for Utah.

He was named to the Western Conference All-Star team for the 2007 NBA All-Star Game. He and Ray Allen were selected as replacements for injured original members Allen Iverson and Steve Nash. He was the first Turkish player to participate in this event.

On Monday, 12 January 2009, Okur established a new career high in points scored when he scored 43 points against the Indiana Pacers.

On 10 July 2009 Okur signed a two-year contract extension reportedly worth approximately $21 million.

On 17 April 2010, Okur ruptured his Achilles' tendon during the first game of the post-season against the Denver Nuggets, eliminating him from the remainder of the NBA playoffs, as well as the World Basketball Championships in his native Turkey later that summer.

He returned on 17 December 2010 and scored 2 points against the New Orleans Hornets.

Türk Telekom Ankara (2011)
In September 2011, Okur signed a contract with Türk Telekom B.K. His contract had an out-clause, which allowed him to return to the NBA when the 2011 NBA lockout was resolved.

New Jersey Nets (2011–2012)
On 22 December 2011, Okur was traded to the New Jersey Nets for a 2015 second round pick. This reunited him with former Jazz teammate, PG Deron Williams, who was traded to the Nets the previous season.

On 15 March 2012, Okur was traded to the Portland Trail Blazers along with Shawne Williams and a 2012 1st round draft pick in exchange for Gerald Wallace. He was waived by Portland on 21 March 2012.

Later in 2012, Okur decided to retire from basketball, citing injuries.  In Okur's final 2 years in the league, he only played 30 games total. His final game being on January 25, 2012, where he recorded 11 points, 6 rebounds and 3 assists in a 97–90 win over the 76ers.

NBA career statistics

Regular season

|-
| align="left" | 
| align="left" | Detroit
| 72 || 9 || 19.0 || .426 || .339 || .733 || 4.7 || 1.0 || .3 || .5 || 6.9
|-
| style="text-align:left; background:#afe6ba;"| †
| align="left" | Detroit
| 71 || 33 || 22.3 || .463 || .375 || .775 || 5.9 || 1.0 || .5 || .9 || 9.6
|-
| align="left" | 
| align="left" | Utah
| 82 || 25 || 28.1 || .468 || .270 || .850 || 7.5 || 2.0 || .4 || .8 || 12.9
|-
| align="left" | 
| align="left" | Utah
| 82 || 82 || 35.9 || .460 || .342 || .780 || 9.1 || 2.4 || .5 || .9 || 18.0
|-
| align="left" | 
| align="left" | Utah
| 80 || 80 || 33.3 || .462 || .384 || .765 || 7.2 || 2.0 || .5 || .5 || 17.6
|-
| align="left" | 
| align="left" | Utah
| 72 || 72 || 33.2 || .445 || .388 || .804 || 7.7 || 2.0 || .8 || .4 || 14.5
|-
| align="left" | 
| align="left" | Utah
| 72 || 72 || 33.5 || .485 || .446 || .817 || 7.7 || 1.7 || .8 || .7 || 17.0
|-
| align="left" | 
| align="left" | Utah
| 73 || 73 || 29.4 || .458 || .385 || .820 || 7.1 || 1.6 || .5 || 1.1 || 13.5
|-
| align="left" | 
| align="left" | Utah
| 13 || 0 || 12.9 || .355 || .313 || .750 || 2.3 || 1.5 || .3 || .3 || 4.9
|-
| align="left" | 
| align="left" | New Jersey
| 17 || 14 || 26.7 || .374 || .319 || .600 || 4.8 || 1.8 || .5 || .3 || 7.6
|- class="sortbottom"
| style="text-align:center;" colspan="2"| Career
| 634|| 460|| 29.1 || .458 || .375 || .797 || 7.0 || 1.7 || .5 || .7 || 13.5
|- class="sortbottom"
| style="text-align:center;" colspan="2"| All-Star
| 1 || 0 || 15.0 || 1.000 || .000 || .000 || 2.0 || 1.0 || .0 || .0 || 4.0

Playoffs

|-
| align="left" | 2003
| align="left" | Detroit
| 17 || 0 || 19.0 || .438 ||.538 || .531 || 4.1 || .8 || .7 || .7 || 5.5
|-
| style="text-align:left; background:#afe6ba;" | 2004†
| align="left" | Detroit
| 22 || 0 || 11.5 || .470 || .400 || .692 || 2.8 || .4 || .2 || .4 || 3.7
|-
| align="left" | 2007
| align="left" | Utah
| 17 || 17 || 34.4 || .388 || .316 || .786 || 7.8 || 1.8 || 1.4 || .9 || 11.8
|-
| align="left" | 2008
| align="left" | Utah
| 12 || 12 || 38.5 || .423 || .373 || .773 || 11.8 || 1.9 || .7 || .7 || 15.4
|-
| align="left" | 2009
| align="left" | Utah
| 2 || 2 || 21.5 || .167 || .333 || .750 || 5.0 || 2.0 || .0 || .5 || 4.0
|-
| align="left" | 2010
| align="left" | Utah
| 1 || 1 || 11.0 ||  1.000  ||  1.000  ||  1.000  || 2.0 || .0 || .0 || .0 || 7.0
|- class="sortbottom"
| style="text-align:center;" colspan="2"| Career
| 71 || 32 || 23.6 || .415 || .362 || .713 || 5.9 || 1.1 || .7 || .6 || 8.1

Coaching career
Before working as a coach, Okur was an ambassador for the Utah Jazz from 2014 to August 2016. On 13 September 2016, he agreed to a deal that made him one of the newest player development coaches for the Phoenix Suns. Okur would soon become the first Turkish-born coach to ever be a part of an NBA coaching staff in some capacity. With the earlier hiring of Canadian Jay Triano, it would also mark the first time that two foreign-born coaches would take part in participating in the Suns' coaching staff at the same time. He would also be reunited with his former teammate Earl Watson and former coach Tyrone Corbin, although their roles would be different with Watson being the head coach and Corbin being an assistant coach.

After seeing slight improvements in his first season as a player development coach, Okur was fired alongside assistant coach Nate Bjorkgren and fellow player development coach Jason Fraser on 22 October 2017. The sudden firing came after the Suns had some very poor performances to start out their 50th anniversary season, leading to a 0–3 start to their season.

Personal life
He is married to actress and former Miss Turkey finalist Yeliz Çalışkan. They have a daughter, Melisa, born on 21 March 2007, and two sons, Yiğit Mehmet Okur, born on 19 February 2010, and Mert Mehmet Okur, born on 19 November 2014. He and his family currently live in San Diego, California.

See also
 
 List of European basketball players in the United States
 List of foreign NBA coaches

References

External links
 Basketball-Reference.com: Mehmet Okur
 Career Stats
 NBA Player Profile
Official Homepage
 TurkSports.Net Mehmet Okur
 Player Profile @ Euroleague.net
 TBLStat.net Profile

1979 births
Living people
2002 FIBA World Championship players
Anadolu Efes S.K. players
Centers (basketball)
Detroit Pistons draft picks
Detroit Pistons players
National Basketball Association All-Stars
National Basketball Association players from Turkey
New Jersey Nets players
Oyak Renault basketball players
Sportspeople from Yalova
Phoenix Suns assistant coaches
Power forwards (basketball)
Tofaş S.K. players
Turkish expatriate basketball people in the United States
Turkish men's basketball players
Türk Telekom B.K. players
Utah Jazz players